Rockland Township may refer to several places in the United States:

 Rockland Township, Ontonagon County, Michigan
 Rockland Township, Berks County, Pennsylvania
 Rockland Township, Venango County, Pennsylvania

See also
Rockland (disambiguation)

Township name disambiguation pages